Kentucky Ridge State Forest is a state forest in Bell County, Kentucky, United States. The  forest was created in 1930 as part of the Land Use and Resettlement Program. In 1954, the United States gave the forest to the state of Kentucky. It contains Pine Mountain State Resort Park.

References

Kentucky state forests
Protected areas established in 1930
Protected areas of Bell County, Kentucky